Jean-Pierre Talatini (born 18 April 1976) is a Paralympian athlete from France competing mainly in category F34 throwing events.

He competed in the 2008 Summer Paralympics in Beijing, China. There he won a bronze medal in the men's F33-34/52 javelin throw event but failed to medal in the shot put in the same category.

External links
 
 

1976 births
Living people
French male javelin throwers
French male shot putters
Paralympic athletes of France
Paralympic bronze medalists for France
Athletes (track and field) at the 2008 Summer Paralympics
Medalists at the 2008 Summer Paralympics
Paralympic medalists in athletics (track and field)